This is a list of cities in Cuba with at least 20,000 inhabitants, listed in descending order. Population data refers to city proper and not to the whole municipality, because they include large rural areas with several villages. All figures are accurate  and provincial capitals are shown in bold.

See also 
 List of places in Cuba
 Municipalities of Cuba
 Provinces of Cuba

References

External links 

 2012 population statistics of Cuba 

 
Cuba, List of cities in
Cities

Cuba